Telangana state Residential School, Sarvail is the first residential school set up by a state government in India. The school was established on 23rd November 1971 by the Andhra Pradesh now Telangana state government under supervision of then Chief Minister of the state Shri. P V Narasimha Rao,  in the small village Sarvail in Nalgonda District. The same were later on conceived as Navodaya Vidhyalaya when P V Narasimha Rao became Minister for HRD under  Rajiv Gandhi government.

History
The former Prime Minister of India, P.V. Narasimha Rao and the benevolence of Sarvodaya leader, Maddi Narayana Reddy, led to the donation of 44 acres of land for the school. "It was a place for thousands of parents in this economically and educationally backward region to look forward to educating their children," recalls Chukka Ramaiah, noted academic and MLC.

Dormitories
Tagore
maddi narayana reddy
Jcbose
Cvraman
Ramanujam
kcr
Nagarjuna
Netaji
Bhagat singh

Principals
 First principal: Sri. P.V. Adinarayan Sastry 1971–1976.
 Second principal: Sri. D. Damodar 1976–1977
 Third principal: Sri. Srinivas Reddy ( 1977-1979)
 Sri. V. Raghunatha Chary (1979-1979)
 Sri. K. Damodar         ( 1979-1981)
 Sri. V.V Sathya Narayan Rao  (1981-1985)
 Sri. M. Sathyanarayana (FAC) (1985-1986)
 Sri. Battula Shyam Prasad    (1986-1990)
 Smt. G. Vijaya Laxmi         (1990-1993)
 Sri. Venkata Narsaiah        (1993–1997)
 Sri. C.S.Prasad              (1997-1999)
 Sri. Prabhakar Reddy         (1999-2001)
 Sri. P. Dananjaya            (2001-2005)
 Sri. N. Balabrahma Chary     (2005-2012)
 Sri  Achary (FAC)            (2013-2015)
 Sri. Upendar Reddy          (2015 - 2016)
 Sri. KVN Acharya            (2016 - 2020) 
 Sri. G.Anjan Reddy          (present)

See also
Education in India
List of schools in India

References

External links
 APRSS Alumni Association's website
 Article in The Hindu about Ruby Jubilee event

Educational institutions established in 1971
Nalgonda district
1971 establishments in Andhra Pradesh
Boarding schools in Telangana